The following is an list of articles relating to Viswema of Nagaland, sorted in alphabetical order.

0–9 
 2010 Mao Gate incident
 2020–21 Dzüko Valley wildfires

D 
 Dzüko Valley

J 
 John Government Higher Secondary School

H 
 Holshe Khrie-o
 Hovithal Sothü

K 
 Kezol–tsa Forest
 Kropol Vitsü

M 
 Mount Tempü

P 
 Pcheda

S 
 Southern Angami-II (Vidhan Sabha constituency)
 Swe–ba

T 
 Te–l Khukhu
 Teyozwü Hill

V 
 Viseyie Koso
 Viswema
 Viswema Hall
 Viswesül Pusa
 Vizadel Sakhrie
 Vizol Koso

Z 
 Zale Neikha

Viswema-related lists